The Norfolk County Council election took place on 7 May 1993, coinciding with local elections for county councils in England.

The Conservatives lost control of the County Council for the first time since it was formed in the 19th century, amid dire results for the party nationally.

The Council shifted to No Overall Control with the Conservatives winning 34 seats, 13 less than the previous election, their share of the vote decreasing by 6.9%. Labour came second winning 32 seats up 4 on last time with their share of the vote increasing 1.8%. The Liberal Democrats made the biggest gains winning 7 seats and increasing their share of the vote by 8.2%. 2 independents were also elected.

Summary of results

|-bgcolor=#F6F6F6
| colspan=2 style="text-align: right; margin-right: 1em" | Total
| style="text-align: right;" | 84
| colspan=5 |
| style="text-align: right;" |
| style="text-align: right;" | 
|-

Results by division

Breckland

Broadland

Great Yarmouth

King's Lynn and West Norfolk

North Norfolk

Norwich

South Norfolk

References

1993 English local elections
1993
20th century in Norfolk